Abstract Imagists is a term derived from a 1961 exhibition in the Guggenheim Museum, New York called American Abstract Expressionists and Imagists. This exhibition was the first in the series of programs for the investigation of tendencies in American and European painting and sculpture.

Style
It had been recognized that the paintings of Josef Albers, Barnett Newman, Mark Rothko, Adolph Gottlieb, Ad Reinhardt, Clyfford Still and Robert Motherwell were all very different yet the symbolic content was achieved "through dramatic statement of isolated and highly simplified elements." 
In many cases the dramatic simplification was achieved by the use of:

geometric means: Josef Albers; Franz Kline; Hans Hofmann
compression: Grace Hartigan; George McNeil
intricate elaboration of canvas surfaces: Richard Pousette-Dart; Robert Richenburg; John Ferren;  Jimmy Ernst;
isolated shapes or signs: Adolph Gottlieb, Robert Motherwell
detailed over-all patterning of the canvas: William Baziotes
simplified structure through the dominance of the large, unified color shapes: James Brooks, Esteban Vicente, Adja Yunkers, Cameron Booth; Giorgio Cavallon

In some cases there was a "loss of the feeling and immediacy" in the work.

List of Abstract Imagists
Sources:

Josef Albers
William Baziotes
Norman Bluhm
Cameron Booth
James Brooks
Lawrence Calcagno
Nicolas Carone
Giorgio Cavallon
Nassos Daphnis
Enrico Donati
Edward Dugmore
Friedel Dzubas
Jimmy Ernst
John Ferren
 Sam Francis
 Helen Frankenthaler
Michael Goldberg
Arshile Gorky
Adolph Gottlieb
Cleve Gray
Stephen Greene
John Grillo
Philip Guston
Grace Hartigan
Al Held
Hans Hofmann
Ralph Humphrey
Paul Jenkins
Alfred Jensen
Jasper Johns
Ellsworth Kelly
Franz Kline
Willem de Kooning
Alfred Leslie
Michael Loew
Morris Louis
Conrad Marca-Relli
Roberto Matta
George McNeil
Joan Mitchell
Kyle Morris
Robert Motherwell
Barnett Newman
Kenneth Noland
Raymond Parker
Jackson Pollock
Richard Pousette-Dart
Robert Rauschenberg
Ad Reinhardt
Milton Resnick
Robert Richenburg
William Ronald
Mark Rothko
Ludwig Sander
Leon Smith
Theodoros Stamos
Frank Stella
Clyfford Still
Mark Tobey
Bradley Walker Tomlin
Jack Tworkov
Albert Urban
Esteban Vicente
Jack Youngerman
Adja Yunkers

Some other Abstract Imagists 

Perle Fine (1908–1988)
Ilse Getz (1917–1992)
Rollin Crampton (1896–1970)
Robert Goodnough (1917–2010)
David Hare (1917–1992)
Buffie Johnson (1912–2006)
William King (1925-)
Gabriel Kohn (1910–1975)
George Ortman (1926–2015)
James Rosati, (1911–1988)

See also
New York Figurative Expressionism
American Figurative Expressionism
Expressionism
Abstract Expressionism
New York School

Related styles, trends, schools or movements
Action painting
Abstract expressionism
New York School
Color field painting
Hard-edge painting
Minimalism
All-over painting
Pattern and Decoration

References

Sources
Virgil Baker, From realism to reality in recent American painting. (Lincoln : University of Nebraska Press, 1959.)
Bernard H. Friedman, School of New York: some younger artists. (New York, Grove Press [©1959])
Sam Hunter, Modern American Painting and Sculpture. ([New York, Dell Pub. Co., 1959])
Harold Rosenberg, The Tradition of the New. (New York, Horizon Press, 1959)
György Kepes, The Visual Arts Today. (Middletown, Conn., Wesleyan University Press [1960])

Abstract expressionism
Contemporary art exhibitions
American contemporary art